Syncopation is a musical term for the stressing of a normally unstressed beat in a bar or the failure to sound a tone on an accented beat. It may also refer to:
 
Syncopation (dance), dancing on unstressed beats, or improvised steps
Syncopation (1929 film), early American musical
Syncopation (1942 film), American musical
Syncopation in algebra, a way of writing algebra that is not rhetorical, but also not fully symbolic
"Syncopation", a 1926 violin and piano piece by Fritz Kreisler
Syncopation, a 1982 album by Sly and Robbie
"Syncopation", a song by Billy Ocean on the 1984 album Suddenly
"Syncopation", a song by Babymetal on the 2016 album Metal Resistance

See also
Syncope (disambiguation)